The Cellar is a historic home located at Enfield, Halifax County, North Carolina. It dates to the early-19th century, and is a large two-story, five bay, frame dwelling with an attached one-story kitchen. It has exterior brick end chimneys and is covered with a rather steep gable roof.  It was the childhood home of Congressman and Confederate General Lawrence O'Bryan Branch (1820-1862).  The house was visited by the Marquis de Lafayette during his grand tour.

It was listed on the National Register of Historic Places in 1979.

References

Houses on the National Register of Historic Places in North Carolina
Houses in Halifax County, North Carolina
National Register of Historic Places in Halifax County, North Carolina